In Japan, shinise are long-established businesses that have been in operation for a long time, at least for a hundred years. Some are older than a thousand years. Japan has significantly more very old businesses than other countries, and they and their products enjoy a particular prestige in Japan.

Characteristics 
Long-established companies are particularly common in Japan, which is home to over half of the world's companies that are older than 200 years. As of 2020, the country had more than 33,000 shinise, of which 3,100 were older than 200 years, 140 older than 500 years and at least 19 who say that they have been operating for over 1,000 years. Shinise are a source of national and regional pride, and are the subject of governmental promotion, business management books and travel guides.  

Frequently, shinise are relatively small family businesses guided by a particular set of principles (kakun). These principles tend to emphasize continuity, tradition, longstanding business relationships, sticking to the core business, accumulating cash reserves and avoiding debt and other risk. This limits growth but helps the companies weather even severe crises. Some shinise, however, have grown to be leading players in their fields, such as the video game maker Nintendo or the general contractor Takenaka.

The prevalence of shinise in Japan is attributed to the particularities of Japanese culture, such as reverence for traditions and one's ancestors, and Japanese history, such as the country's relatively long global isolation prior to the 19th century. To ensure familial continuity, shinise owners without children of their own sometimes adopt one of their male employees. One effect of the high prestige that shinise enjoy in Japan is that startups are less respected or appreciated than elsewhere.

Shinise products 
Buying something from a shinise imparts particular prestige in Japan, connoting the "pinnacle of taste". This Japanese preference for shinise is distinguished from the appreciation most societies have for luxury goods in that it does not only include expensive, long-lasting items such as cars and watches, but also everyday objects and food.

This consumer preference may have roots in Japanese society's predilection for conformity, which makes it so that somebody who owns a shinise item is certain not to be ridiculed for it, and frequently respected. As a result, brand loyalty to shinise is often intense, which in turn helps these companies survive for a long time.

List of shinise 

This list aims to include all shinise founded before 1600, and selected notable younger shinise.

See also 
 List of oldest companies

References 

Economy of Japan